FC Pune City (R) was FC Pune City's reserve team that participanted in the I-League 2nd Division. FC Pune City Academy was the youth setup of FC Pune City. They participated in Youth League U18 and U15, as well as Pune Football League.

History

Formation
On 26 August 2016, it was announced that FC Pune City had purchased the Pune F.C. Academy and rebranded it under their name. At the same time, the team unveiled their youth development plans which included fielding teams in Youth League U18 and U15, as well as Subroto Cup and Pune Football League.

Shut down

FC Pune City Reserves and Academy got dissolved in 2019, soon after their first team FC Pune City shut down its operations due financial and technical difficulties. The club's ownership was sold. The franchise rights was bought by Hyderabad-based IT entrepreneur Vijay Madduri and former Kerala Blasters FC CEO Varun Tripuneni. They subsequently launched a new club, Hyderabad FC.

Last squad

Honours
 IFA Shield
 Winners (1): 2017
 Bandodkar Gold Trophy
 Winners (1): 2016

References

External links
 Official Website 

Academy
Football academies in India
Indian reserve football teams
2016 establishments in Maharashtra
Youth League U18